Ugo Crescenzi (25 April 1930 – 9 January 2017) was an Italian politician and member of the Christian Democrats (DC). Crescenzi served as the first President of the Italian region of Abruzzo from 1970 until 1972. He served a second, non-consecutive tenure as Abruzzo's President from 1973 to 1974. He later became a member of the national Chamber of Deputies from 1987 to 1992 as a DC deputy during the Legislature X. Ugo Crescenzi, who spent decades as a prominent DC official in Abruzzo, is credited with improving the modern infrastructure of the city of Pescara, the capital of the region.

Crescenzi was born on 25 April 1930 in San Benedetto del Tronto in the neighboring region of Marche. He moved to Pescara after completing his university studies and married into a Pescaran family.

Crescenzi has been credited with expanding much of Pescara's modern infrastructure. His contributions to the city included the renovations and modernization of the Abruzzo Airport and the Pescara railway station, the expansion of an existing highway, and upgrades to the marina.

Crescenzi was admitted to hospital on 5 January 2017 for kidney failure. He died four days later in a Pescara hospital on 9 January 2017, at the age of 86. His funeral was held at the Sacro Cuore di Pescara Catholic Church in Pescara on 11 January in Pescara with burial at the Colonnella cemetery in Teramo.

See also
1970 Abruzzo regional election

References

1930 births
2017 deaths
People from San Benedetto del Tronto
Christian Democracy (Italy) politicians
Deputies of Legislature X of Italy
Presidents of Abruzzo
Politicians of Marche